Valérien may refer to:

 Fort Mont-Valérien, a fortress
 Harry Valérien (1923-2012), German sports journalist and television presenter
 Valérien Ismaël (born 1975), French footballer

See also 
 
 
 Valeri (name)
 Valerian (disambiguation)
 Valeriano, a name
 Valerianus (disambiguation)
 Valerie (disambiguation)
 Valery, a name